CJK Unified Ideographs Extension B is a Unicode block containing rare and historic CJK ideographs for Chinese, Japanese, Korean, and Vietnamese.

The block has dozens of variation sequences defined for standardized variants.

It also has thousands of ideographic variation sequences registered in the Unicode Ideographic Variation Database (IVD). These sequences specify the desired glyph variant for a given Unicode character.

It was the only CJK Unified Ideographs Extension block with a UCS2003 source identifier. Since Extension B contained too many characters, the original code charts were produced with a single glyph for all regions. The glyphs were designed by Beijing Zhongyi Electronic Ltd. After the introduction of multi-column code charts on Unicode 5.2, the original glyphs were retained under the UCS2003 source identifier until Unicode 14.0. The glyphs are packaged in the "SimSun-ExtB" font distributed with the Simplified Chinese versions of Windows, and do not adhere to the glyphs for the Mainland China region.

Known issues

Unifiable variants and exact duplicates in Extension B
Also in CJK Unified Ideographs Extension B, hundreds of glyph variants were encoded. In addition to the deliberate encoding of close glyph variants, six exact duplicates (where the same character has inadvertently been encoded twice) and two semi-duplicates (where the CJK-B character represents a de facto disunification of two glyph forms unified in the corresponding BMP character) were encoded by mistake:
 U+34A8 㒨 = U+20457 𠑗 : U+20457 is the same as the China-source glyph for U+34A8, but it is significantly different from the Taiwan-source glyph for U+34A8
 U+3DB7 㶷 = U+2420E 𤈎 : same glyph shapes
 U+8641 虁 = U+27144 𧅄 : U+27144 is the same as the Korean-source glyph for U+8641, but it is significantly different from the Chinese Mainland-, Taiwan- and Japan-source glyphs for U+8641
 U+204F2 𠓲 = U+23515 𣔕 : same glyph shapes, but ordered under different radicals
 U+249BC 𤦼 = U+249E9 𤧩 : same glyph shapes
 U+24BD2 𤯒 = U+2A415 𪐕 : same glyph shapes, but ordered under different radicals
 U+26842 𦡂 = U+26866 𦡦 : same glyph shapes
 U+FA23 﨣 = U+27EAF 𧺯 : same glyph shapes (U+FA23 﨣 is a unified CJK ideograph, despite its name "CJK COMPATIBILITY IDEOGRAPH-FA23.")

Block

History
The following Unicode-related documents record the purpose and process of defining specific characters in the CJK Unified Ideographs Extension B block:

References 

Unicode blocks